Coromandel may refer to:

Places

India
Coromandel Coast, India
Presidency of Coromandel and Bengal Settlements
Dutch Coromandel
Coromandel, KGF, Karnataka, India

New Zealand
Coromandel, New Zealand, a town on the Coromandel Peninsula
Coromandel Peninsula
Coromandel Range, ridge of hills in Coromandel Peninsula
Coromandel (New Zealand electorate)

Elsewhere
Coromandel, Minas Gerais, a Brazilian municipality
Coromandel, Mauritius, a town in the Republic of Mauritius
Coromandel Valley, South Australia, a suburb of Adelaide
Coromandel East, a suburb of Adelaide

Vessels
HMS Coromandel, one of four former ships of the British Royal Navy
Coromandel (ship): a number of merchant vessels have also been named Coromandel

Other
Coromandel International, an Indian corporation
Coromandel railway station, on the Belair railway line in Blackwood, South Australia
Coromandel!, 1955 historical novel by John Masters
Coromandel screen, an item of furniture
Coromandel wood, another name for calamander
Coromandel, a perfume created for Chanel by Jacques Polge and Christopher Sheldrake

See also